Events in the year 2021 in the Solomon Islands.

Incumbents
 Monarch: Elizabeth II
 Governor-General: David Vunagi
 Prime Minister: Manasseh Sogavare

Events
Ongoing — COVID-19 pandemic in Solomon Islands, 2021 Solomon Islands unrest

Deaths
 

5 February – Paul Tovua, politician, Speaker of the National Parliament of Solomon Islands (born 1947).

References

 
2020s in the Solomon Islands
Years of the 21st century in the Solomon Islands
Solomon Islands
Solomon Islands